Eva Svensson (born 27 May 1987) is a Swedish orienteering and ski-orienteering competitor, and junior world champion in both sports.

Orienteering
She became Junior World Champion in sprint in Dubbo in 2007, and received a bronze medal in 2006. She received silver medals in relay in both the 2006 and 2007 junior world championships.

Ski orienteering
Svensson received four individual gold medals and two bronze medals at the Junior World Ski Orienteering Championships in 2005, 2006 and 2007. At the Junior World Ski Orienteering Championships in Salzburg in 2007, she won a gold medal in the long distance, a gold medal in the middle distance, a bronze medal in the sprint, as well as being part of the Swedish winning team in the relay.

References

External links
 

1987 births
Living people
Swedish orienteers
Female orienteers
Foot orienteers
Ski-orienteers
Swedish female cross-country skiers
Junior World Orienteering Championships medalists
21st-century Swedish women